Anadora is a genus of beetles in the family Buprestidae, containing the following species:

 Anadora cupriventris Obenberger, 1922
 Anadora mechowi (Quedenfeldt, 1886)
 Anadora margotana Novak, 2010
 Anadora occidentalis Bellamy, 1986
 Anadora pavo (Gestro, 1881)
 Anadora rivularis Obenberger, 1924
 Anadora silvatica Bellamy, 1986

References

Buprestidae genera